Raychikhinsk is a town in Amur Oblast, Russia, located in the Zeya–Bureya basin, about  from the Amur River and the border with China, and about  east of Blagoveshchensk, the administrative center of the oblast. Population:

History
The town is located near a brown coal deposit which had been known of since the late 1800s. Mining began in 1913, with the foundation of the first permanent settlement in 1932, named Raychikha after a local stream.

From 1938 until 1942, Raychikha was host to a prison camp of the gulag system, where up to 11,000 prisoners were kept for forced labor in the mining of coal.

In 1944, it was granted town status and given its present name.

Administrative and municipal status
Within the framework of administrative divisions, it is, together with three rural localities, incorporated as Raychikhinsk Urban Okrug—an administrative unit with the status equal to that of the districts. As a municipal division, this administrative unit also has urban okrug status.

Economy
Brown coal mining remains the main economic focus of the town; two open-pit mines surround the town almost completely.

Transportation
The town is terminus for a  branch line, which connects to the Trans-Siberian Railway at Bureya.

References

Notes

Sources

Cities and towns in Amur Oblast
Populated places established in 1932
Monotowns in Russia